Trey Palmer is an American football player. The term may also refer to:
Trey Palmer, character in Home and Away